Raft Mountain is a mountain in east-central British Columbia, Canada, located north-east of Clearwater and just outside the south boundary of Wells Gray Provincial Park. The Clearwater River flows to the west, Raft River to the east, Spahats Creek to the north, and North Thompson River to the south. Raft Mountain is part of the Shuswap Highland. Trophy Mountain is the closest summit to the north.

Access
The Raft River Forest Service Road and other industrial roads provide access to the south side of the mountain. Check in advance for logging activity. Some sections of this road require four-wheel drive and high clearance. A hike of about 2.5 hours goes up the meadows to the west ridge, then to the summit. An all-day hike crosses the five summits. 

The north face of Raft Mountain can be reached via Spahats Creek Road which turns east off Clearwater Valley Road (also called Wells Gray Park Road). Good clearance but not four-wheel drive is needed. A rough trail leads from the pass into Caligata Lake Provincial Park below the north face. A hiking and scrambling route goes from the lake into the Cirque of Tarns and up to Raft's east ridge and third summit. 

Road and hiking directions for both routes are essential and can be found in Exploring Wells Gray Park (6th edition). 

Groomed cross-country ski trails are located on the lower slopes of Raft Mountain and are maintained by the Wells Gray Outdoors Club. 

A network of snowmobile trails on Raft Mountain is maintained by the Clearwater Sno-Drifters Club. The group also operates two warming huts near treeline.

Naming
The Overlanders expedition to the Cariboo goldfields rafted down the North Thompson River in 1862. When they arrived at the mouth of the Clearwater River, they noticed this prominent peak and named it for their rafts. They also named the Clearwater River for its distinct clarity compared to the muddy North Thompson and the nearby Raft River.

References

BCGNIS entry "Raft Mountain"

Two-thousanders of British Columbia
Wells Gray-Clearwater
Kamloops Division Yale Land District